Unreal Estate is an Australian lifestyle television program which premiered on the Nine Network on 27 September 2016, hosted by Kate Langbroek and comedian Cameron Knight. The series looks at extraordinary Australian homes and meeting the larger-than-life people who live in them.

Broadcast
The series was set to premiere on 31 August 2016, but this was delayed after an additional episode of Married at First Sight Australia was added to the planned timeslot of Unreal Estate shortly before that date. The series was subsequently rescheduled to debut on Tuesday, 27 September 2016 at 8:40 pm.

Episodes

See also
 List of programs broadcast by Nine Network
 List of Australian television series

References

Nine Network original programming
2016 Australian television series debuts
2016 Australian television series endings
Australian non-fiction television series
Australian travel television series